Rein Ahas (10 December 1966 – 18 February 2018) was an Estonian geographer and a professor at the University of Tartu.

Education
In 1991 he received his undergraduate degree in Physical Geography and Nature Conservation from the University of Tartu, in 1994 he completed his MSc and in 1999 his PhD, with the thesis "Spatial and Temporal Variability of Phenological Phases in Estonia", supervised by Prof. Ülo Mander and Jaan Eilart.

Employment
2013–2015 Researcher-professor of the Estonian Academy of Sciences                                                                                                                              
2011–2018 Visiting professor at the Geography Department of the Ghent University, Belgium
2006–2018 Professor of Human Geography, University of Tartu, Department of Geography
2002–2006 Senior researcher, University of Tartu, Department of Geography 
1998–2000 Lecturer, University of Tartu, Institute of Geography 
1994–2000 Researcher, University of Tartu, Institute of Geography

visiting researcher
ETH of Zürich, Switzerland (2012)
Umeå University, Sweden (2011)
Vienna Technical University, Austria (2008)
Oxford University, Environmental Change Institute, UK (2001)
Fulbright visiting researcher at the University of Milwaukee, Wisconsin, USA (2001)

Research
The main research topics included spatial mobility of people, travel, urban geography and segregation. Special interest on using and developing mobile positioning based methods. Previous research included the impact of climate change, environmental impact and seasonality.

Scientific activities focus to Mobility Lab of University of Tartu.

Co-founder and co-owner of spin-off company Positium LBS.

Death
On 18 February 2018, Ahas collapsed while competing in the Tartu Ski Marathon. He was resuscitated by fellow skiers and taken to the University of Tartu Hospital, where he died of what was determined to be a myocardial infarction, aged 51.

Acknowledgments
 2012 ISI Essential Science Indicators (ESI) cumulative citation count rose above the 1% threshold.
 2007 Association of American Geographers, Climate Specialty Group. John Russell Mather Paper of the Year 2006 for the article Schwartz, MD, Ahas, R., Aasa, A. 2006. Onset of Spring Starting Earlier Across the Northern Hemisphere. Global Change Biology. 12(2): pp. 343–351.
 2006 Junior Prigogine Medal, University of Siena and the Wessex Institute of Technology in honour of the late Professor Prigogine's Nobel Prize in Chemistry.
 1983 School students’ Scientific Association's (ÕTÜ) Research Medal

Publications
Top 5 cited publications in Google Scholar 
 Ahas, R. 1999. Long-term phyto-, ornitho- and ichthyophenological time-series analyses in Estonia. Int. J. Biometeorology, 42, pp. 119–123.
 Ahas, R., Aasa, A., Menzel, A., Fedotova, V.G., Scheifinger, H. 2002. Changes in European spring phenology. Int. J. Climatology, 22, pp. 1727–1738.
 Ahas, R., Ü. M. 2005. Location based services—new challenges for planning and public administration?. Futures, 37, pp. 547–561.
 Menzel, A., Sparks, T., Estrella, N., Koch, E., Aasa, A., Ahas, R., Alm-Kübler K., et al. 2006. European phenological response to climate change matches the warming pattern. Global Change Biology, 12: pp. 1969–1976.
 Schwartz, MD, Ahas, R., Aasa, A. 2006. Onset of Spring Starting Earlier Across the Northern Hemisphere. Global Change Biology. 12(2): pp. 343–351.

External links
Estonian Research Portal - Rein Ahas
University of Tartu, Department of Geography

References

1966 births
2018 deaths
Estonian geographers
University of Tartu alumni
Academic staff of the University of Tartu